Red, also known in some releases as Red the Half-Breed, is a Canadian drama film, directed by Gilles Carle and released in 1970. An exploration of anti-indigenous racism, the film stars Daniel Pilon as Reginald "Red" Mackenzie, the Métis half-brother of an otherwise all-white family of siblings, who becomes the primary suspect when his sister Elizabeth (Fernande Giroux), the wife of wealthy car dealer Frédéric Barnabé (Gratien Gélinas), is murdered.

The film's cast also includes Geneviève Deloir, Donald Pilon, Yvon Dufour, Claude Michaud and Raymond Cloutier.

The film won three Canadian Film Awards at the 22nd Canadian Film Awards, for Best Supporting Actor (Gélinas), Best Supporting Actress (Giroux) and Best Cinematography (Bernard Chentrier).

References

External links

1970 films
Canadian drama films
1970s French-language films
Films set in Quebec
Films shot in Quebec
Métis film
Films directed by Gilles Carle
French-language Canadian films
1970s Canadian films